Gimme Indie Rock is a 7-inch EP by Sebadoh, released in 1991. First pressing comes on clear vinyl and black vinyl. Later reissued on translucent green vinyl and on marbled gray vinyl.  The EP was included in its entirety on the reissued version of Sebadoh III.

Track listing 
"Gimme Indie Rock" - 3:23
"Ride The Darker Wave" - 1:42
"Red Riding Good" - 1:53
"New King" - 2:27
"Calling Yog Soggoth" - 2:59

References

External links

Gimme Indie Rock!  at Discogs.com

1991 EPs
Sebadoh EPs
Homestead Records EPs